Gail Honeyman (born 1972) is a Scottish writer whose debut novel, Eleanor Oliphant is Completely Fine, won the 2017 Costa First Novel Award.

Biography 
Born and raised in Stirling in central Scotland to a mother who worked as a civil servant and a father in science, Honeyman was a voracious reader in her childhood, visiting the library "a ridiculous number of times a week".

She studied French language and literature at the University of Glasgow before continuing her education at the University of Oxford with a postgraduate course in French poetry. However, she decided that an academic career was not for her and started a string of "backroom jobs", first as a civil servant in economic development and then as an administrator at the University of Glasgow.

While working as an administrator, Honeyman enrolled in a Faber Academy writing course, submitting the first three chapters of what would become Eleanor Oliphant is Completely Fine to a competition for unpublished fiction by female writers, run by Cambridge's Lucy Cavendish College. The novel, published in 2017, went on to earn numerous awards and wide critical acclaim.

Books 
Eleanor Oliphant is Completely Fine won the 2017 Costa First Novel Award, and since then Honeyman has been interviewed often, including by The Guardian, The Daily Telegraph and Waterstones. Of her relationship with the book's titular character she told The Daily Telegraph: "Eleanor Oliphant isn't me, or anyone I know [but] of course I've felt loneliness – everybody does". In January 2018, Honeyman said she was working on a new novel, "set in a different period and location."

References

1972 births
Living people
Scottish women novelists
Costa Book Award winners
Alumni of the University of Glasgow
People from Stirling
21st-century Scottish women writers
21st-century Scottish writers
21st-century Scottish novelists